Metin Aydın (born 6 March 1993) is a Turkish footballer who plays as a defender . He made his Süper Lig debut on 1 February 2012.

References

External links
 
 
 

1993 births
Living people
Footballers from Ankara
Turkish footballers
Turkey youth international footballers
MKE Ankaragücü footballers
Hatayspor footballers
Süper Lig players
TFF First League players
TFF Second League players
TFF Third League players
Association football defenders